Anatoli Vasilyevich Bashashkin (23 February 1924, Reutovo, Moscow Governorate, Russia – 27 July 2002, Moscow, Russia) was a Soviet and Russian footballer in the 1940s and 1950s and a football coach later. He played as a central defender.

He was captain of the Soviet Union at the 1952 Olympics, but following their politically embarrassing defeat to Yugoslavia he was stripped of the captaincy.

In 1947–1953 Bashashkin was a member of the CDKA team that won four domestic titles in the 1940s and earlier 1950s (1947, 1948, 1950, 1951), but following the 1952 Olympics the team was disbanded by Joseph Stalin. After that he moved to Spartak Moscow in 1953. After Stalin's death he returned to CDKA (renamed CDSA at that time) in 1954 and played there until 1958. Bashashkin was part of the USSR team which won the 1956 Olympic football title. He won USSR Gold medals five times (four times with CDKA in 1947, 1948, 1950, 1951 and once with Spartak in 1953) and Soviet Cup three times (1948, 1951, 1955).

He was noted for his ability on the ball, physical strength and his long-range passing, which started countless counterattacks.

After retirement from football Bashashkin graduated from the Malinovsky Military Armored Forces Academy and served in Ukraine as a tank military officer of the Soviet Army. Later he returned to football as a coach. Bashahkin was the main coach of Pakhtakor Tashkent FK in 1976 and he was an assistant coach (under Konstantin Beskov) of FC Spartak Moscow in 1981. According to journalist Pavel Alyoshin, Bashashkin was not very successful as a coach, spending much time telling the players of the 1970s and 80s how inferior they were compared to the footballers of the 1950s.

References

External links

1924 births
2002 deaths
People from Reutov
Soviet footballers
Soviet Union international footballers
Russian footballers
PFC CSKA Moscow players
FC Spartak Moscow players
Olympic footballers of the Soviet Union
Footballers at the 1952 Summer Olympics
Footballers at the 1956 Summer Olympics
Honoured Masters of Sport of the USSR
Recipients of the Order of the Red Banner of Labour
Olympic gold medalists for the Soviet Union
Soviet football managers
Pakhtakor Tashkent FK managers
Olympic medalists in football
Medalists at the 1956 Summer Olympics
Association football defenders
Sportspeople from Moscow Oblast